Roy Stark may refer to:

Roy Stark (The Walking Dead)
Roy Stark (footballer) in FA Youth Cup Finals of the 1970s 
Roy Stark, character played by David Keith